Paul Elliott (born 18 October 1947) is an English cinematographer. He was nominated for three ASC Awards for his work on the television films Citizen Cohn (1992), And the Band Played On (1993), and Truman (1995), winning for the lattermost.

Selected filmography

 1985: Biohazard
 1986: The Tomb
 1986: Armed Response
 1987: Rachel River
 1988: Friday the 13th Part VII: The New Blood
 1988: 976-EVIL
 1989: Far from Home
 1990: Welcome Home, Roxy Carmichael
 1991: Final Verdict
 1991: And You Thought Your Parents Were Weird
 1991: My Girl
 1992: Citizen Cohn
 1993: Blind Side
 1993: And the Band Played On
 1994: My Girl 2
 1994: Someone She Knows
 1995: The Piano Lesson
 1995: If Someone Had Known
 1995: Truman
 1997: Riot
 1997: Soul Food
 1998: Thanks of a Grateful Nation
 1999: Lost & Found
 1999: Diamonds
 2000: The Broken Hearts Club: A Romantic Comedy
 2000: If These Walls Could Talk 2
 2002: King of Texas
 2004: Elvis Has Left the Building
 2004: Fat Albert
 2008: Spy School
 2008: Front of the Class
 2009: Georgia O'Keeffe
 2009: Deadly Impact
 2011: The Sunset Limited
 2013: Dark Around the Stars

Awards and nominations

References

External links
 
 

1947 births
Living people
English cinematographers
People from London
Film people from London
Alumni of the London Film School
Sundance Film Festival award winners